Emma Lucy Ann Gates Bowen (November 5, 1882 – April 30, 1951) was an American opera singer and later the wife of Albert E. Bowen, a member of the Quorum of the Twelve Apostles of the Church of Jesus Christ of Latter-day Saints (LDS Church). She was often referred to as Lucy Gates and after her marriage as Lucy Gates Bowen or Lucy Bowen.

Early life and education
Emma Lucy Gates was born to Jacob Forsberry Gates and Susa Young, in St. George, Utah Territory. She was a granddaughter of Brigham Young and Lucy Bigelow Young.

Gates did not began her formal musical studies until the age of 12. At age 14, she won a piano competition at an eisteddfod held in Salt Lake City. She studied both violin and piano as well as vocal performance. In 1898, she traveled to Göttingen, Germany to study. The next year she began studies at the Berlin Conservatory, but later began private studies under Blanche Corelli.

Career 
Gates received a contract with the Royal Opera of Berlin in 1909 and in 1911 became the prima coloratura soprano with the Kassel Royal Opera. In 1915, Gates formed the Lucy Gates Grand Opera Company with her brother B. Cecil Gates. After her marriage in 1916, she continued performing in operas and did recordings with Columbia Records. She appeared in La traviata in Newark in 1919. She sang at the Brooklyn Academy of Music in 1920, and at New York's Aeolian Hall in 1920 and 1922.

In 1928, Lucy Bowen served as an alternate delegate to the Republican National Convention from Utah. In 1937, her husband Albert Bowen was called as a member of the Quorum of the Twelve Apostles of the LDS Church and it was about this time that Lucy ended most of her public music appearances, although she continued teaching those seeking to enter opera until her death. Her last public concert appearance was in 1948.

Personal life and legacy 
In July 1916, Lucy Gates married widower Albert E. Bowen. Lucy and Albert Bowen did not have any children together, but she raised his twin sons from his first marriage. Bowen died in Salt Lake City of a cerebral hemorrhage, leaving her husband a widower for the second time. One of the Heritage Halls at Brigham Young University is named for Bowen. There are collections of her papers in the Utah State Historical Society and at Brigham Young University.

See also
Descendants of Brigham Young

Notes

References

Ernest L. Wilkinson, ed., Brigham Young University: The First 100 Years (Provo, Utah: Brigham Young University Press, 1975) Vol. 2, p. 732-733.

External links

1882 births
1951 deaths
Latter Day Saints from Utah
American operatic sopranos
Richards–Young family
Utah Republicans
20th-century American women politicians
20th-century American politicians
American expatriates in Germany